Haftan-e Olya (also Romanized as Haftān-e ‘Olyā and Haftān-i-‘Uliya; also known as Bābālar and Haftān-e Bālā) is a village in Rudbar Rural District, in the Central District of Tafresh County, Markazi Province, Iran. At the 2006 census, its population was 336, in 95 families.

References 

Populated places in Tafresh County